Radsia is a genus of chitons belonging to the family Chitonidae.

The species of this genus are found in Southern America and Africa.

Species:

Radsia barnesii 
Radsia goodallii 
Radsia nigrovirescens 
Radsia sulcatus

References

Chitonidae
Chiton genera